Crossroads: 2010 is the fifteenth solo studio album by the rapper Bizzy Bone.

Singles 
The first single, "So Cool" was released on April 20, 2010.

Track listing

References

2010 albums
Bizzy Bone albums
Sumerian Records albums